The Carneal House is a historic residence located at 405 East Second Street in Covington, Kentucky, United States. Commonly believed to be Covington's oldest surviving structure, the home was begun in the year 1815 by Thomas D. Carneal, one of the founders of the city of Covington. Carneal House is a two-story brick home with arched windows, built in an Italianate-Federalist style and somewhat influenced by late-Renaissance architect Andrea Palladio. Among noted visitors to the home was Revolutionary War hero the Marquis de Lafayette, who paid a call during his final American tour in 1824–1825. House was built for Aaron Gano in 1815 and sold to William Southgate in 1825.  Lafayette's visit to the Southgates has been misunderstood, since the visit took place at Mrs. Adelizza Keene Southgate's home in Lexington, where they were visiting.  ["Pioneers of Progress: The Southgate Family in Northern Kentucky," Northern Kentucky Heritage Magazine, volume XIX, #2, page 3]

After the death of Mr. Carneal, the home was purchased by William Wright Southgate, a Congressman from Northern Kentucky who circa 1835 added the large west wing as residence for his extended family of thirteen children, in-laws, and household retainers. The home is part of Covington's prestigious Riverside Drive Historic District, and in recent years has operated as a private residence, and as a commercial bed and breakfast.

References

Further reading
Federal Writers Project.  Cincinnati: a Guide to the Queen City and Its Neighbors.  Cincinnati: Wiesen-Hart, 1943, 522.

External links
Carneal House Photo
Carneal House Photo
Carneal house slave quarters
Carriage house at Carneal House

Houses completed in 1815
Buildings and structures in Covington, Kentucky
Georgian architecture in Kentucky
Houses in Kenton County, Kentucky
Historic district contributing properties in Kentucky
National Register of Historic Places in Kenton County, Kentucky
Houses on the National Register of Historic Places in Kentucky
Slave cabins and quarters in the United States
1815 establishments in Kentucky